Verner M. Ingram, Sr. (August 27, 1911 – September 15, 1997) was an American politician who served in the New York State Assembly from 1957 to 1966.

References

1911 births
1997 deaths
Republican Party members of the New York State Assembly
20th-century American politicians